James Archibald Platt (born 26 January 1952) is a former footballer who played as a goalkeeper for Northern Ireland.

Playing career
During his career, Platt won 23 caps for Northern Ireland, an amount largely restricted due to the presence of Pat Jennings in the side. At club level, Platt played for the majority of his career at Middlesbrough, and also played for Hartlepool United, Cardiff City and Ballymena United. He conceded a hat trick in a junior match in Northern Ireland, when Kenny McKillop scored 3 goals from outside the box against him.

Platt was also in the Irish team that won the Home Championship the last time it was played.

Managerial and coaching career
As a manager, Platt's first job was to take charge of Ballymena United for a season from 1984–85, after which he had a longer spell at Coleraine, managing them for six years from 1985 to 1991. In 1991, he had another short spell, this time at Ballyclare, for just one season from 1991–92.

For the 1992–93 season, Platt was given the job of managing Swedish outfit Assyriska, in the Swedish First Division. He had a two-season spell managing Darlington one partly with David Hodgson then the other from 1995–96, before leaving full-time management to take a job with Gateshead.

Previously Middlesbrough's Chief Coach at their Football Community Centre. He ran a private football school for local primary school around the Middlesbrough/Stockton Area.

In May 2009, Platt was appointed as Darlington's goalkeeping coach. However, three months later, Platt left the club following manager Colin Todd's sacking.

Family
Platt is the uncle of Angela Platt, a former goalkeeper with both the Ireland women's national field hockey team and the Northern Ireland women's national football team. His nephew and Angela's brother, David Platt, is also a former footballer and played as a goalkeeper for Limavady United, Finn Harps and Derry City. He later managed Coleraine and Limavady United.

In 2019 he was elected to Middlesbrough Council, representing the Middlesbrough Independent Councillors Association.

Honours
Middlesbrough Second Division Championship 1973/74 
Darlington
Division Three Play-off final runner-up: 1995–96

References

External links
 
 Profile at Northern Ireland's footballing greats
 Jim Platt Collection at the National Football Collection
 
 

1952 births
Living people
People from Ballymoney
Association footballers from Northern Ireland
Northern Ireland international footballers
1982 FIFA World Cup players
1986 FIFA World Cup players
Middlesbrough F.C. players
Hartlepool United F.C. players
Cardiff City F.C. players
Ballymena United F.C. players
Coleraine F.C. players
Football managers from Northern Ireland
Coleraine F.C. managers
Ballymena United F.C. managers
Darlington F.C. managers
Gateshead F.C. managers
NIFL Premiership players
Association football goalkeepers
Sportspeople from County Antrim